"One Perfect Day" is a song written by Phillip Buckle, David Hobson, and Paul van Dyk and recorded by Australian singer Lydia Denker as the theme to the 2004 film One Perfect Day (2004). Produced by Sam Melamed, the song is a pop rock love song. It was released as a CD single and maxi single on 16 February 2004 (see 2004 in music) and was the only song released from the soundtrack.

Music video
The music video for the song was directed by Paul Curry for Lightstream Films. It features minor video clips from the One Perfect Day film and shows Denker being chased by a man.

Track listing
"One Perfect Day" – 4:04
"One Perfect Day" (Josh Abrahams remix) – 4:28
"One Perfect Day" (Paul Van Dyk epic dance mix 001) – 7:14
"One Perfect Day" (Quazimodo remix) – 6:59

Charts

References

2004 singles
Film theme songs
Songs written by Paul van Dyk
2004 songs
Universal Records singles